The 8th Transport Regiment "Casilina" is a military logistics regiment of the Italian Army based in Rome. The regiment is operationally assigned to the Army Logistic Command and provides the transport between operational units and the logistic command's maintenance centers. Like all transport units of the Italian Army the regiment was named for a historic road near its base: in the 8th regiment's case for the medieval Via Casilina.

History 
In August 1920 the VII Automobilistic Center was formed in Rome as VII Army Corps support unit. In 1923 the center was renamed VII Transport Grouping, which consisted of a command, an auto group, a train group, and a depot. On 31 October 1926 the grouping was disbanded and its personnel and vehicles used to from the 8th Automobilistic Center. On 1 July 1942 the unit was renamed 8th Transport Regiment. The regiment was disbanded by invading German forces after the announcement of the Armistice of Cassibile on 8 September 1943.

On 17 February 1947 the 8th Transport Center was formed in Rome, which consisted of a command, the 8th Auto Unit, the 8th Light Workshop, the 8th Vehicles Park, a fuel depot, and a depot. The center was disbanded on 31 December 1964 and the 8th Auto Unit became autonomous and was assigned to the VIII Territorial Military Region. Due to the change of command the unit was renamed VIII Mixed Maneuver Auto Unit.

On 30 October 1984 the unit was reorganized and renamed 8th Transport Battalion "Casilina". Like all Italian Army transport units the battalion was for a historic road near its base, in case of the 8th Transport Battalion the Via Casilina was chosen. The battalion received the flag and traditions of the 8th Transport Regiment and consisted of a battalion command, a command and services company, a mixed transport company, and a special transports company.

On 27 April 1998 the battalion was elevated to 8th Transport Regiment "Casilina" without changing size or composition.

Current structure 
As of 2022 the 8th Transport Regiment "Casilina" consists of:

  Regimental Command, in Rome
 Command and Logistic Support Company
 Transport Battalion
 Mixed Transport Company
 Heavy Transport Company
 Maintenance Company

The Command and Logistic Support Company fields the following platoons: C3 Platoon, Transport and Materiel Platoon, Medical Platoon, and Commissariat Platoon.

See also 
 Military logistics

External links
Italian Army Website: 8° Reggimento Trasporti "Casilina"

References 

Logistic Regiments of Italy
1998 establishments in Italy